Mick Hutton (born 5 June 1956 in Chester, UK) is a British jazz bassist and composer.

Career 
Hutton is known from the British jazz scene by his work with Harry Beckett (Pictures of You, 1985) and with Julian Argüelles, Iain Ballamy, Django Bates and Ken Stubbs (First House), the Chris Biscoe Sextet and Bill Bruford's Band Earthworks. In addition, Hutton worked throughout his career with Alan Barnes, Peter Erskine, Tina May, Jim Mullen, John Scofield, Alan Skidmore, Tommy Smith, John Taylor, Stan Tracey, and Kenny Wheeler. In 2002 he played on Robin Williamsons album Skirting the River Road, and the same year he played in a trio with Martin Speake and Paul Motian (Change of Heart).

A hand injury forced him to abandon the upright bass. He started working as bass guitarist, percussionist, and synthesizer player and as a composer. He works with his own band of saxophonist Andy Panayi, pianist Barry Green, and drummer Paul Robinson. With his quartet, including Iain Ballamy (saxes), Ross Stanley (piano) and Paul Robinson (drums), he frequently visits venues around the world.

Selected discography 

With Harry Beckett
1985: Pictures of You (Paladin)

With The Gordon Beck Quintet
1985: Celebration (JMS)

With First House
1986: Eréndira (ECM)
1989: Cantilena (ECM)

With The Chris Biscoe Sextet
1986: Eréndira (Walking Wig)

With Bill Bruford's Earthworks
1987: Earthworks (Edition)
1997: Heavenly Bodies (Venture)

With John Taylor Trio
1991: Blue Glass (Ronnie Scott's Jazz House)

With Tommy Smith
1991: Standards (Blue Note)

With Steve Argüelles
1991: Steve Argüelles (Ah Um)

With Nick Purnell
1991: Onetwothree (Ah Um)

With Lysis
1991: The Wings of the Whale – You Yangs (Soma)

With Stan Sulzman
1991: Feudal Rabbits (Ah Um)

With Estelle Kokot
1999: Alternative Therapy (Sayin' Somethin')

With Ken Stubbs
2000:Ballads (Cherry )

With Robin Williamson
2002: Skirting the River Road (ECM)

With Elkie Brooks & Humphrey Lyttelton
2002: Trouble in Mind (Slave to the Rhythm)

With Gary Husband
2004: Aspire (Jazzizit)

With Liam Noble Group
2004: In the Meantime (Basho)

With Martin Speake
2006: Change of Heart (ECM)

With Joanna Eden
2007: My Open Eye (Mr. Riddles)

With The Boat-Rockers
2007: Live at Appleby 2004 (Mick Hutton)

With Tim Garland
2015: Return to the Fire (Edition)

References

Literature 
 Richard Cook & Brian Morton: The Penguin Guide to Jazz Recordings, 8th Edition, London, Penguin, 2006, .

External links 
Mick Hutton Quartet on YouTube

1956 births
Living people
Avant-garde jazz double-bassists
British jazz bass guitarists
British composers
People from Chester
ECM Records artists
21st-century double-bassists
Earthworks (band) members